Schizomeris is a genus of green algae in the family Schizomeridaceae.

References

External links

Chlorophyceae genera
Chaetophorales